Mullingar is the county town of County Westmeath in Ireland. It is the third most populous town in the Midland Region, with a population of 20,928 in the 2016 census.

The Counties of Meath and Westmeath Act 1543 proclaimed Westmeath a county, separating it from Meath. Mullingar became the administrative centre for County Westmeath. The town was originally named Maelblatha, and takes its modern name from a mill noted in the legend of Colman of Mullingar.

Traditionally a market town serving the large agricultural hinterland, Mullingar remains a significant commercial location. It had a tradition of cattle trading until 2003 when its cattle market was closed for the development of a mixed commercial and residential scheme called Market Point. However, in 2014 the local County Council allowed an annual Christmas Market to take place on Mount Street.

Mullingar has a number of neighbouring lakes, including Lough Owel, Lough Ennell and Lough Derravaragh. Lough Derravaragh is also known for its connection with the Irish legend of the Children of Lir. The town of Mullingar is linked to Lough Ennell via Lacy's Canal and the River Brosna. Another nearby waterway is the Royal Canal, which loops around Mullingar.

Local government and politics 

Westmeath County Council is the local authority for Westmeath. The county council comprises two constituencies or "municipal districts". Mullingar town is in the Mullingar Municipal District which comprises thirteen members.

The town is part of the Longford–Westmeath constituency for elections to Dáil Éireann.

There is a Chamber of Commerce in Mullingar, and Mullingar is one of the three towns that forms the Midlands Gateway region, along with Athlone and Tullamore, set up as part of the Government's National Spatial Strategy 2002–2020.

Tourism 

Mullingar's main tourist attractions are its lakes – Lough Owel, Lough Derravaragh and Lough Ennell – which are visited by anglers and the Royal Canal which flows through the town. Also nearby is Belvedere House and Gardens. The town has several hotels.
The Greville Arms Hotel has latterly begun creating a mini-museum, and also holds the two Brit awards presented to Niall Horan. James Joyce's connection with the hotel is marked on the premises. In the rooftop garden, there stands a large granite monument which formerly stood at Dominick Street.  It was presented to the town by Lord Greville.

One of Mullingar's notable buildings is the cathedral of Christ the King Mullingar, the cathedral of the Diocese of Meath. The cathedral was dedicated on the day World War II broke out.

Columb Barracks, which closed in March 2012, was a military base that housed the 4th Field Artillery Regiment, the 4th Field Supply & Transport Company and the HQ of the 54 Reserve Field Artillery Regiment (Army Reserve).
The 1916 Centenary Monument Green Bridge Mullingar was unveiled by Cllr Billy Collentine MCC on Easter Monday 2017. Mullingar Tidy Towns were the organisation that built this monument in memory of the 1916 Easter Rising.

Mullingar Town Park is a public park situated in the centre of the town, and it includes a wide variety of playgrounds, a swimming pool and a large pond near the centre. On 22 July 2016, the park became one of 22 public spaces in Ireland to be awarded a Green Flag.

Economy 

Among Mullingar's exports are items of pewterware produced by Mullingar Pewter. Also associated with Mullingar is Genesis Fine Art, which produces gift items. The "Pilgrims" sculpture on Mullingar's Austin Friars Street, at which location there once stood an Augustinian Friary, was crafted by Genesis on foot of a commission by the Mullingar chapter of Soroptimists International.

Mullingar's commercial sector has expanded in recent years from just a few shops on the town's main thoroughfares – Oliver Plunkett Street, Austin Friars Street, and Mount Street – to several major shopping areas. There is an out-of-town retail park at Lakepoint (about 1.6  km from the town centre), the Harbour Place Shopping Centre near the town centre, and a development at the Green – on the site of the former Avonmore and Penneys units.

The town has a mix of local retailers and chain stores, and branches of the major banks. The town also has a credit union, Mullingar Credit Union (formerly known as St. Colman's House).

A proposed development, named "Mullingar Central", was to have been located between Mount Street, the Railway station and Blackhall Street. Planning permission was granted for retail, commercial and residential units. Phase 1, which included tax offices, library, civic offices and County Council buildings was officially opened on 11 June 2009. Phase 2, however, did not proceed.

Mullingar contains several industrial estates including Lough Sheever Corporate Park and Clonmore Industrial Estate and Mullingar Business Park.  The Industrial Development Authority (IDA) also has a business park in Marlinstown. As of 2015, only one plot on the site has been acquired by an employer, Patterson Pumps, which is constructing a new plant to which it intends to move its entire Irish operation from its current location, at Mullingar Business Park. Two of the town's manufacturing plants – Penn tennis balls and Tarkett – both closed in the early 2000s causing many job losses. Other local employers include the Midland Regional Hospital at Mullingar, P.E.M. Engineering, Trend Technologies, Taconic International, and Mullingar Pewter.

The town is home to a €25m Lidl warehouse and distribution centre.

Mullingar has a Chamber of Commerce which represents almost 200 businesses from varying commercial sectors.

Transport

Road 

Mullingar lies near the national primary route N4, the main Dublin – Sligo road,  from the capital. The N52 also connects Mullingar to the Galway-Dublin M6 motorway at Athlone to the southwest, and Kells, Ardee and Dundalk to the northeast. The town is served by Bus Éireann services to Dublin, Athlone (where passengers can catch connecting buses), Sligo, Cavan, Tullamore and Ballina.

Waterway 

In the 19th century the town was served for a time by the Royal Canal – however displaced first by the railway and then the car, it is no longer commercially used for the transport of goods or people. The town of Mullingar is also linked to Lough Ennell via Lacy's Canal and the River Brosna.

Railways 

The Midland Great Western Railway line to Mullingar from Dublin opened in stages from 1846 to 1848, arriving in Mullingar on 2 October 1848. This was to a temporary station, adjacent to the greyhound stadium. The original mainline ran from Dublin (Broadstone Station) to Galway via Mullingar, then via Moate to Athlone, the Mullingar to Galway section opening in August 1851. The present station opened with the branch line to Longford on 14 December 1855.

There were two secondary stations in Mullingar, the Canal Crossing cattle bank which was on the Sligo line and, on the Athlone line, Newbrook racecourse which had its own station. This was a two-platformed station with both platforms on the Down Line.

Currently, the Dublin-Sligo railway line northwest to Longford and Sligo is the mainline, Galway is accessed from Heuston Station via Portarlington and the line between Mullingar and Athlone is currently disused. Mullingar station is served by national rail company Iarnród Éireann's Arrow commuter services to Dublin and InterCity trains to/from Sligo.

The Railway Preservation Society of Ireland have a secondary base in the town. There is a photo survey of the disused Athlone Line via Moate.

Healthcare 

The Midland Regional Hospital at Mullingar serves the Longford-Westmeath area. An extension was built in the early 1990s. A change in government, however, halted investment and the extension lay as an empty shell until late 2006 when funding was finally secured to ensure its completion. There are several other hospitals in the town: St Loman's, which provides psychiatric services to the Midlands; St Mary's, a care centre for older people; and the St Francis Private Hospital.

Education 

The town has several primary schools, including a number run under the Catholic ethos, a Church of Ireland school, a non-denominational Educate Together primary school, and two Irish language primary schools. Local second-level schools include Coláiste Mhuire, the town's oldest post-primary school, St Finian's College, Loreto College Mullingar and Mullingar Community College.
Coláiste Mhuire is primarily a boys school, however, the repeat Leaving Certificate class is co-educational. Just to the north of Mullingar on the old Longford Road is St Finian's College. Until 2003, St Finian's was an all-boys boarding school; however, in 2003 the decision was made to phase out the boarding school by 2007, and to admit girls as well as boys. Loreto College for girls is the largest secondary school in the town, while Mullingar Community College is a co-educational school for boys and girls. The Community College also runs evening courses for adults and awards the FETAC certificates.

Wilson's Hospital School, a co-educational boarding school, operates under the patronage of the Church of Ireland (Anglican Communion).  It is located in the nearby village of Multyfarnham. It serves day students from the Mullingar area.

St. Joseph's Secondary School, a co-educational school located in the nearby village of Rochfortbridge, also serves the Mullingar area.

Culture

Media
Two print newspapers serve the community: the Westmeath Examiner and the Westmeath Topic.

Music 
The Mullingar Town Band was founded in 1879 by Father Polland as a Holy Family Confraternity Band. The local military barracks supplied some of the early members, who themselves were serving members of the British Regimental bands stationed in Mullingar. The Mullingar Confraternity Band remained under the auspices of the Confraternity until the 1940s when it was handed over to a committee and continued under the title of Mullingar Brass and Reed Band. The band has a dual role as a concert band and a marching band (the latter known as the Celtic Crusaders). In 2017, the Celtic Crusaders won the Irish Marching Band Association League.

First opened in 1989, "The Stables" is a music venue in Mullingar, which critic and writer Ronan Casey described as an "essential" stop for national touring acts.

Niall Horan, born and raised in Mullingar, is a member of the boy band One Direction. Horan has won four Brit Awards and four MTV Video Music Awards with One Direction. Niall Breslin, from the band The Blizzards, is also from Mullingar. The Academic is another local band.

Live venues include the Mullingar Arts Centre, the Greville Arms, and the Mullingar Park Hotel.

The 2022 Fleadh Cheoil is due to be held in Mullingar in August 2022.

In popular culture 

In Doubt, a 2008 film adaptation of the John Patrick Shanley stage play, starring Meryl Streep and Philip Seymour Hoffman, the town is referenced in a dialogue between the main character, Sister Aloysius (Streep), and the school caretaker.

Mullingar featured on Three Men in a Boat on BBC 2 in December 2009, in an episode called "Three Men Go to Ireland". Dara Ó Briain, Rory McGrath and Griff Rhys Jones visited Mullingar Greyhound Stadium during the episode, where Dara O'Briain's dog Snip Nua raced.

The Furey Brothers also sang "The Reason I Left Mullingar", a song written in 1980 by Pat Cooskey.

The song "Ode in Praise of The City of Mullingar", was written by William J Macquorn Rankine.

Mullingar is mentioned in the song "The Rocky Road to Dublin" by The Dubliners. It is one of the few songs in the 2009 film, Sherlock Holmes that was not composed for the film.

The town is also associated with Irish author James Joyce, who was an occasional visitor to Mullingar during his youth. Joyce's father, John, was a civil servant posted from Dublin to compile an electoral register of Mullingar and the surrounding townlands. He often stayed in the Greville Arms Hotel. James referred to Mullingar in three of his novels, mentioning it twelve times in Ulysses, in chapter 14 of Stephen Hero, and three times in Finnegans Wake.

Mullingar was mentioned at the end of the song "Horse Outside" by the Rubberbandits, in which the bridesmaid was promised a horseback ride out to Mullingar.

Pat of Mullingar is an Irish rebel song.

Outside Mullingar, a play by John Patrick Shanley, starred Will and Grace star Debra Messing.

Sport

GAA 
There are seven Gaelic Athletic Association football clubs in the Mullingar area: Mullingar Shamrocks, St. Loman's Mullingar, Ballymore GAA, Raharney GAA, St. Mary's GAA and The Downs and Shandonagh are the senior teams. St Oliver Plunkett's and Cullion play hurling at intermediate and senior levels. The Westmeath GAA team plays its home games at Cusack Park. Mullingar also supports women's teams including Shandonagh, Mullingar Shamrocks and St Lomans Mullingar.

Football 
Mullingar has three adult football teams; Mullingar Athletic (who play in Gainstown), Mullingar Town (who have their grounds in D'Alton Park), and Mullingar Celtic (who play their home games in the Raithin community pitch which is shared with Grange Utd, an under 18 side).

Tennis and badminton 

The facilities of the Mullingar Tennis and Badminton Club include eight outdoor tennis courts and a hall containing two badminton courts. The club was founded in 1892 by members of the Uisneach Badminton Club.

Greyhound racing 

When programmed, greyhound track racing occurs upon the Lynn Greyhound track on Thursday and Saturday evenings. The track featured on the BBC 'Three Men Go to Ireland' show where Dara O'Briain's dog Snip Nua raced.

Golf 
Mullingar Golf Club was created in 1953, and hosts an annual competition, the Mullingar Scratch Cup, every August. This competition has been won by Des Smyth, Pádraig Harrington, Darren Clarke, and Paul McGinley. The 2006 winner was Rory McIlroy.

Boxing 
Two-time Olympian boxer John Joe Nevin is from Mullingar. He won a silver medal in the bantamweight competition at the 2012 Summer Olympics.

Hockey 
Mullingar Hockey Club is based in Loreto College and was formed in 1979. The club has two men's teams, one lady's team and an underage section.

Other sports 
In athletics, the Mullingar Harriers club has produced several Olympians. Club member Bobby Begley was Irish team manager when Eamonn Coughlan won the 5,000 meters World Championship in 1983.

Mullingar rugby football club is located in Cullionbeg. The club also made it to the 1989 towns cup final.

In basketball, the Mullingar Monarchs club (formed in 2001) and Mullingar Dragons (formed in 2007) are local teams. The latter plays in the North-Eastern Basketball League.

Mullingar Equestrian Centre, outside the town, hosts competitions and offers lessons. Other schools in the area include Ladestown House Riding Stables and Catherinestown Riding School. Studs include Tally Ho Stud, Cleaboy Stud, and Charlestown Stud.

Other sports clubs in the area include an the Midland Tigers Australian Rules Football team, Lakeside Wheelers Mullingar Cycling club (which is affiliated to Cycling Ireland), the Mullingar Harbour Canoe Polo Club (based on the Royal Canal), and St Mary's Snooker Club (on Bishopsgate Street).

People 
 John Alexander, Victoria Cross recipient
 Niall Breslin (Bressie) and The Blizzards, musicians
 Eugene Casserly, U.S. Senator from California, born in Mullingar.
 Breon Corcoran, chief executive officer (CEO) of Betfair
 Joe Dolan, singer
 J. P. Donleavy, author
 Wellington Guernsey, 19th-century composer and writer
 Josephine Hart, Baroness Saatchi, author and wife of Lord Saatchi
 Niall Horan, singer-songwriter and member of One Direction
 Thomas Kavanagh, recipient of the Victoria Cross
 Aidan Keena, footballer
 Tina Kellegher, actress
 Shane Lowry (golfer), winner of the 2019 Open Championship
 Terry McMahon, actor, writer and filmmaker
 Joseph Murphy, Irish equestrian Olympian 2012
 John Joe Nevin, boxer
 Michael O'Leary, CEO of Ryanair
 Declan Power, defence and security analyst and author
 Connor Smith, footballer for Yeovil Town, defender
 Ailish Tynan (born 1975), operatic soprano

Climate 
The climate in this area has mild differences between highs and lows, and there is adequate rainfall year-round.  The Köppen Climate Classification subtype for this climate is "Cfb" (Marine West Coast Climate/Oceanic climate). With a yearly mean of 9.3 degrees Celsius, Mullingar is the coldest place in Ireland.

See also 
 List of towns and villages in Ireland
 List of market houses in the Republic of Ireland

Notes

References

Further reading

External links 

 
 Mullingar Chamber of Commerce

 
County towns in the Republic of Ireland
Towns and villages in County Westmeath